The Wheels Up Tour was the fourth headlining tour by American country music trio, Lady Antebellum. The tour was in support of their sixth studio album, 747 (2014) that began on February 28, 2015, in Oslo, Norway, and concluded on October 3, 2015, in Las Vegas. It was the forty-fifth ranked show of 2015, according to Pollstar and grossed $23.2 million.

Background
On January 6, 2015, while appearing on The Talk, the trio first announced the tour with cities being announced shortly after. Lady Antebellum will take the tour to Europe, Australia and North America. In North America the tour will be a part of Live Nation's Country Megaticket. The tour's name "Wheels Up" is played off from the title of the band's current album, 747, like a plane taking off.
 
Band member Charles Kelley says about the tour, "The magic of being with fans from all over the country is really why we're ultimately all here." "Being able to play off each other on that stage is honestly where we have the most fun, and I have a feeling the crowd will already be on their feet when we get out there after starting the night with Hunter and Sam!"

Production
For the show's production it was designed to match the music of Lady Antebellum, according to production designer, Bruce Rodgers. He also went on to stay that their music inspired it. The stage is designed to give a 3D look by using an oval shaped portal, a video screen, a latticework of LED lights, and three lighting pods that can play at different elevations.

Concert synopsis
The show begins with the instrumental of "Long Stretch of Love" with the video screen being the only thing lit up. The image on the screen is filled with colors such as blue and purple, in the middle is a speaker that moves along to the music. After nearly a minute of this the middle screen begins to rise and all three screens go dark. As it rises a bright light emerges and then when the light diminishes Scott, Haywood, and Kelley emerge through where the middle video screen was and start singing "Long Stretch of Love". The screen then descends back down. Lady Antebellum ends the night with "We Owned the Night".

Opening acts

Kelsea Ballerini 
The Band Perry 
Lee Brice 
Kristian Bush 
Brandy Clark 
Troy Cassar-Daley 
Brantley Gilbert 
Hunter Hayes 
Sam Hunt 
Kip Moore 
Maddie & Tae 
Thompson Square

Setlist
{{hidden
| headercss = background: #ccccff; font-size: 100%; width: 59%;
| contentcss = text-align: left; font-size: 100%; width: 75%;
| header = Europe & Australia
| content = Some songs not performed at every show
"Bartender"
"Long Stretch of Love"
"Our Kind of Love"
"Just a Kiss"
"Love Don't Live Here" 
"Just a Girl"
"American Honey"
"Lie with Me"
"Compass" 
"Lookin' for a Good Time"
"One Great Mystery" 
Medley: "Dancin' Away with My Heart"/"Wanted You More"/"Goodbye Town"/"Hello World"
"Islands in the Stream" 
"Downtown" 
"I Run to You"
"Freestyle"
"American Woman" 
"We Owned the Night"
Encore
"Need You Now"
"Wake Me Up" 
"Cups (When I'm Gone)" 

Source:
}}
{{hidden
| headercss = background: #ccccff; font-size: 100%; width: 59%;
| contentcss = text-align: left; font-size: 100%; width: 75%;
| header = North America Before June 24th
| content =
"Long Stretch of Love"
"Bartender"
"American Honey"
"Freestyle"
"Our Kind of Love"
"Just a Kiss" (
"Compass" (
"Perfect Day"
Heading To B-Stage 
"Love Don't Live Here" 
B-Stage
"One Great Mystery"
"Thinking Out Loud" 
"Let's Get It On" 
"Dancing Away with My Heart"
Heading To Main Stage 
"I Run to You"
Main stage 
"Downtown" 
"Any Man of Mine" 
"Walk This Way" 
"Lookin' for a Good Time"
Encore
"747"
"Need You Now"
"We Owned the Night"

Source:
}}
{{hidden
| headercss = background: #ccccff; font-size: 100%; width: 59%;
| contentcss = text-align: left; font-size: 100%; width: 75%;
| header = North America After June 24th
| content =
"Long Stretch of Love"
"Bartender"
"American Honey"
"Freestyle"
"Our Kind of Love"
"Just a Kiss" (
"Compass" (
"Perfect Day"
Heading To B-Stage 
"Love Don't Live Here" 
B-Stage
"One Great Mystery"
"Thinking Out Loud" 
"Let's Get It On" 
"Dancing Away with My Heart"
Heading To Main Stage 
"I Run to You"
Main Stage 
"Downtown" 
"Any Man of Mine" 
"Walk This Way" 
"Lookin' for a Good Time"
Encore 1
"747"
"Need You Now"
"We Owned the Night"
Encore 2
"Landslide" 
}}

Tour dates

 		
Canceled shows
June 13, 2015: Southaven — BankPlus Amphitheater(Canceled due to scheduling conflicts)

List of festivals & fairs
 These concerts were a part of the Country 2 Country music festival.	
 This concert was a part of the CMC Rocks Queensland Festival.
 This concert was a part of the Carolina Country Music Festival.
 This concert is a part of the Rockin' River Country Music Festival.
 This concert is a part of the Big Valley Jamboree.
 This concert is a part of the Allen County Fair.
 This concert is a part of the Pepsi Gulf Coast Jam.

Live DVD
The Lady Antebellum: Wheels Up Tour was released to DVD on November 13, 2015. It was shot during their June 27 show in Irvine, California.

Personnel

Band
Dave Haywood: Guitar, mandolin, piano, vocals
Charles Kelley: Vocals
Hillary Scott: Vocals
Clint Chandler: Mandolin
Dennis Edwards: Bass guitar
Jason "Slim" Gambill: Acoustic guitar, electric guitar
Jonathon Long: Accordion, musical director, piano
Chris Tyrrell: Drums

Crew
Brett "Scoop" Blanden: FOH Engineer 
Arlo Guthrie: Lightning design
Bruce Rodgers: Production design

Other
Red Light Management: Management

References

2015 concert tours
Lady A concert tours